South Cotabato's 1st congressional district is one of the two congressional districts of the Philippines in the province of South Cotabato. It has been represented in the House of Representatives since 1987. The district covers its southern municipalities of Polomolok, Tampakan and Tupi, and, until 2022, the independent city of General Santos. It is currently represented in the 18th Congress by Shirlyn Bañas Nograles of the PDP–Laban.

Representation history

Election results

2022

2019

2016

2013

2010

See also
Legislative districts of South Cotabato

References

Congressional districts of the Philippines
Politics of South Cotabato
Politics of General Santos
1987 establishments in the Philippines
Congressional districts of Soccsksargen
Constituencies established in 1987